The Jersey Liberal Conservatives is a centre-right party in Jersey founded in 2021 to compete for the following year's general election. It was officially registered on 8 January 2022.

Founding members include former the Bailiff of Jersey Philip Bailhache. The party describes itself as being conservative on economic matters and liberal on sociocultural matters.

Electoral performance

References

External links 

 

Political parties in Jersey
Political parties established in 2022